The La Meseta Formation is a sedimentary sequence deposited during the Eocene. The formation is found on Seymour Island, Antarctica.

Description 
La Meseta Formation lies unconformably on the Cretaceous Lopez de Bertodano Formation. The depositional environment was probably coastal, deltaic or estuarine in character. The top of the sequence is an erosional unconformity to Pleistocene glacial gravels. La Meseta Formation is one of the sequences that make up the fill of the Late Jurassic to Paleogene James Ross Basin.

Fossil content 
La Meseta Formation is extremely rich in fossils. Among mammals, the meridiungulata Antarctodon and Trigonostylops have been found in the formation. as well as marsupial Microbiotheria. It is famous for its penguin fossils, for example the two genera Archaeospheniscus and Palaeeudyptes.Other bird fossils include Dasornis, a genus of pseudotooth birds. There is also an abundance of trace fossils. Diplocraterion, Helminthopsis, Muensteria, Oichnus, Ophiomorpha, Skolithos, Teredolites and Zapfella have been described. Over 35 species and 26 families of fish have been described from the Ypresian Cucullaea bed.

Mammals

Astrapotheria
 Antarctodon sobrali
 Trigonostylopidae indet.

Cetacea
  Basilosaurus sp.
 Llanocetus denticrenatus
 Zygorhiza sp.

Derorhynchidae
 Derorhynchus minutus
 Pauladelphys juanjoi
 Xenostylos peninsularis

Litopterna
 Notiolofos arquinotiensis
 Victorlemoinea sp.

Marsupialia
 Marambiotherium glacialis
 Woodburnodon casei

Polydolopimorphia
 Antarctodolops
 A. dailyi
 A. mesetaense
 Perrodelphys coquinense
 Polydolops
 P. dailyi
 P. seymouriensis
 P. thomasi

Sudamericidae
 Sudamerica ameghinoi

Birds

Sphenisciformes 
 Anthropornis
 A. grandis
 A. nordenskjoldi
 Archaeospheniscus
 A. lopdelli
 A. wimani 
 Delphinornis
 D. arctowskii
 D. graclis
 D. larseni
 Marambiornis exilis 
 Meseraornis polaris 
 Palaeeudyptes
 P. antarcticus
 P. gunnari 
 P. klekowskii
 Wimanornis seymourensis
 Tonniornis
 T. mesetaensis
 T. minimum

Pelagornithidae 
 Dasornis sp.

Amphibians 

 Calyptocephalella sp.

Fish 
 Otodus auriculatus
 Hexanchus sp. 
 Pristiophorus laevis
 cf. Xiphiorhynchus

Plants 

 Notonuphar antarctica
 ?Nelumbo sp.

See also 

 List of fossiliferous stratigraphic units in Antarctica

References

Further reading 
 R. A. Askin. 1997. Eocene-?Earliest Oligocene terrestrial palynology of Seymour Island, Antarctica. : 993-996. The Antarctic Region: Geological Evolution and Processes 993-996
 M. A. Bitner. 1991. A supposedly new brachiopod from the Paleogene of Seymour Island, West Antarctica. Polish Polar Research 12(2):243-246
 D. B. Blake and R. B. Aronson. 1998. Eocene stelleroids (Echinodermata) at Seymour Island, Antarctic Peninsula. Journal of Paleontology 72(2):339-353
 M. Bond, M. A. Reguero, S. F. Vizcaino and S. A. Marenssi. 2006. A new 'South American ungulate' (Mammalia: Litopterna) from the Eocene of the Antarctic Peninsula. Geological Society, London, Special Publications 258:163-176
 J. A. Case. 1988. Paleogene floras from Seymour Island, Antarctic Peninsula. Geology and Paleontology of Seymour Island Antarctic Peninsula 523-540
 M. M. Cenizo. 2012. Review of the putative Phorusrhacidae from the Cretaceous and Paleogene of Antarctica: new records of ratites and pelagornithid birds. Polish Polar Research 33(3):225-244
 A. L. Cione, M. de las Mercedes Azpelicueta, and D. R. Bellwood. 1995. An oplegnathid fish from the Eocene of Antarctica. Palaeontology 37(4):931-940 
 A. L. Cione and M. A. Reguero. 1994. New records of the sharks Isurus and Hexanchus from the Eocene of Seymour Island, Antarctica. Proceedings of the Geologists' Association 105:1-14
 J. Kriwet. 2005. Additions to the Eocene Selachian Fauna of Antarctica with Comments on Antarctic Selachian Diversity. Journal of Vertebrate Paleontology 25(1):1-7
 S. A. Marenssi, M. A. Regeuro, S. N. Santillana and S. F. Vizcaino. 1994. Eocene land mammals from Seymour Island, Antarctica: palaeobiogeographical implications. 6(1):3-15
 I. Poole, A. M. W. Mennega, and D. J. Cantrill. 2003. Valdivian ecosystems in the Late Cretaceous and Early Tertiary of Antarctica: further evidence from myrtaceous and eucryphiaceous fossil wood. Review of Palaeobotany and Palynology 124:9-27
 R. R. Pujana, S. N. Santillana, and S. A. Marenssi. 2014. Conifer fossil woods from the La Meseta Formation (Eocene of Western Antarctica): Evidence of Podocarpaceae-dominated forests. Review of Palaeobotany and Palynology (200)122-137
 S. F. Vizcaino, M. A. Reguero, S. A. Marenssi and S. N. Santillana. 1997. New land mammal-bearing localities from the Eocene La Meseta Formation, Seymour Island, Antarctica. The Antarctic Region: Geological Evolution and Processes 997-1000

Geologic formations of Antarctica
Paleogene System of Antarctica
Paleontology in Antarctica
Sandstone formations
Siltstone formations
Shale formations
Mudstone formations
Conglomerate formations
Deltaic deposits
Lagoonal deposits
Shallow marine deposits
Tidal deposits
James Ross Island group